Adriana Aparecida da Silva (born 22 July 1981) is a Brazilian long-distance runner who competes in half marathons and marathons. She has represented her country at World Championship-level both on the roads and in cross country. She won two gold medals in the marathon at the 2011 Pan American Games in Guadalajara, Mexico and 2015 Pan American Games in Toronto, Ontario, Canada.

She is a member of Esporte Clube Pinheiros.

Career
Adriana da Silva was born in Cruzeiro, São Paulo, and started her career as a cross country runner. She represented Brazil in the junior races at the IAAF World Cross Country Championships in 1998 and 2000. Following a national title win in the half marathon, she made her first senior appearance on the world stage at the 2004 IAAF World Half Marathon Championships, coming in 39th place.

After a break in her athletics career, da Silva returned to action in 2008 and ran for Brazil at the 2010 IAAF World Cross Country Championships, ending the race in 82nd place. She made her marathon debut at the Santa Catarina Marathon in Florianópolis and won on her first attempt, recording a time of 2:41:30 hours. She was selected for the Brazilian squad at the 2009 World Championships in Athletics as a result and improved her best to 2:40:54 hours to finish 43rd in the Berlin race. In 2010, she came third at the São Paulo Marathon, just two seconds outside of her personal best time. She won the Río de Janeiro Half Marathon in July and went on to have her highest global placing at the 2010 IAAF World Half Marathon Championships in Nanning, where she was 25th in the rankings. The 2010 Berlin Marathon in September saw her significantly improve her best with a finishing time of 2:32:30 hours for seventh place.

In 2011, she ran at the Vienna City Marathon and was sixth with a time of 2:33:48 hours. Later that year, she won the South American title in the half marathon. The 2011 Pan American Games saw her ascend to the peak of the regional scene as she won the marathon gold medal in a Games record time of 2:36:37 hours, in spite of Guadalajara's high altitude. She set a personal best of 2:29:17 hours at the 2012 Tokyo Marathon, finishing ninth overall.  She competed at the 2012 Summer Olympics, finishing 47th in a time of 2:33:15.

In 2015, she was the gold medalist in the marathon at the Pan American Games in Toronto, Ontario, Canada after the  Peruvian athletic Gladys Tejeda lost her gold medal. She also broke the Games record with a time of 2:35:40 hours.

Personal bests
5000 m: 16:12.88 –  São Paulo, 8 June 2013
10,000 m: 33:21.59 –  São Paulo, 6 June 2013
Half marathon: 1:13:16 –  Buenos Aires, 11 September 2011
Marathon: 2:29:17 –  Tokyo, 26 February 2012

Achievements

References

External links

 
 
 Tilastopaja biography

1981 births
Living people
Brazilian female long-distance runners
Brazilian female marathon runners
Athletes (track and field) at the 2011 Pan American Games
Sportspeople from São Paulo (state)
Athletes (track and field) at the 2012 Summer Olympics
Athletes (track and field) at the 2016 Summer Olympics
Olympic athletes of Brazil
Athletes (track and field) at the 2015 Pan American Games
Pan American Games gold medalists for Brazil
Pan American Games medalists in athletics (track and field)
Medalists at the 2011 Pan American Games
Medalists at the 2015 Pan American Games
21st-century Brazilian women
20th-century Brazilian women
People from Cruzeiro, São Paulo